Woolbrook may refer to:

 Woolbrook, New South Wales, Australia
 A tributary of the River Sid in East Devon, England
 A suburb of Sidmouth, East Devon, England